Marsden is a village in the Canadian province of Saskatchewan within the Rural Municipality of Manitou Lake No. 442 and Census Division No. 13. It gained notoriety shortly after the impact of the Buzzard Coulee meteorite near the village on 20 November 2008.

Marsden is located along Highway 40, just east of Wells Lake, and about 4 miles north-west of Manitou Lake.

The village was named after Marsden, West Yorkshire in England. That was the birthplace of the wife of Alex F. Wright, the first postmaster.

History 
Marsden incorporated as a village on 24 April 1931.

Demographics 

Parks and recreation
About four miles south-east of Marsden is Big Manitou Regional Park, which is on Manitou Lake. The park offers camping, golfing, ball diamonds, and other activities.

Arts and culture
Marsden is the host of the annual Quad War, a Society for Creative Anachronism event. It is a Renaissance / Middle Ages full costume festival and war. It attracts approximately 500 people, mostly society members from Alberta and Saskatchewan. It is usually held in the first week of August.

Notable People
Bruce Gordon

See also 
 List of communities in Saskatchewan
 Villages of Saskatchewan

References

External links

Villages in Saskatchewan
Manitou Lake No. 442, Saskatchewan
Division No. 13, Saskatchewan